Rampart Ridge is a  elevation mountain ridge located in the Cascade Range, in Kittitas County of Washington state. It is situated northeast of Hyak, Washington, and the north end of Keechelus Lake, within the Alpine Lakes Wilderness, on land managed by Wenatchee National Forest. Its nearest higher peak is Alta Mountain,  to the north-northeast, and Dungeon Peak rises  to the south-southwest. The north-south trending ridge is characterized by vertical cliffs on its west-facing side above the Gold Creek valley, and gentle meadows with lakes on the eastern side, such as Rachel Lake, Lake Lillian, and the Rampart Lakes. The descriptive name of rampart was officially adopted 1918 by the United States Board on Geographic Names based on a suggestion by The Mountaineers. Precipitation runoff from the ridge drains into tributaries of the Yakima River.

Climate
Rampart Ridge is located in the marine west coast climate zone of western North America.  Most weather fronts originate in the Pacific Ocean, and travel northeast toward the Cascade Mountains. As fronts approach, they are forced upward by the peaks of the Cascade Range, causing them to drop their moisture in the form of rain or snowfall onto the Cascades (Orographic lift). As a result, the west side of the Cascades experiences high precipitation, especially during the winter months in the form of snowfall. During winter months, weather is usually cloudy, but, due to high pressure systems over the Pacific Ocean that intensify during summer months, there is often little or no cloud cover during the summer. Because of maritime influence, snow tends to be wet and heavy, resulting in avalanche danger.

Geology
The Alpine Lakes Wilderness features some of the most rugged topography in the Cascade Range with craggy peaks and ridges, deep glacial valleys, and granite walls spotted with over 700 mountain lakes.  Geological events occurring many years ago created the diverse topography and drastic elevation changes over the Cascade Range leading to the various climate differences.  These climate differences lead to vegetation variety defining the ecoregions in this area.

The history of the formation of the Cascade Mountains dates back millions of years ago to the late Eocene Epoch. With the North American Plate overriding the Pacific Plate, episodes of volcanic igneous activity persisted.  In addition, small fragments of the oceanic and continental lithosphere called terranes created the North Cascades about 50 million years ago.

During the Pleistocene period dating back over two million years ago, glaciation advancing and retreating repeatedly scoured the landscape leaving  deposits of rock debris. The last glacial retreat in the Alpine Lakes area began about 14,000 years ago and was north of the Canada–US border by 10,000 years ago. The "U"-shaped cross section of the river valleys are a result of that recent glaciation. Uplift and faulting in combination with glaciation have been the dominant processes which have created the tall peaks and deep valleys of the Alpine Lakes Wilderness area.

See also
List of peaks of the Alpine Lakes Wilderness
List of lakes of the Alpine Lakes Wilderness
Geography of Washington (state)

References

External links
 Weather forecast: Rampart Ridge
Alpine Lakes Wilderness (Mt. Baker-Snoqualmie National Forest) U.S. Forest Service
Rampart Ridge The Mountaineers
 Hiking Rampart Ridge: YouTube

Mountains of Washington (state)
Mountains of Kittitas County, Washington
Cascade Range
Ridges of Washington (state)